Dorsa Tetyaev is a wrinkle ridge system at  in Mare Crisium on the Moon. It is 188 km long and was named after Soviet geologist Mikhail Mikhailovich Tetyaev in 1979.

References

Tetyaev